The following lists events that happened during 1903 in Chile.

Incumbents
President of Chile: Germán Riesco

Events 
3 June – The Club Deportivo Arturo Fernández Vial is founded.

Births
date unknown – Magdalena Petit (d. 1968)
date unknown – Esteban Serrador (d. 1978)
6 February – Claudio Arrau, pianist (d. 1991)
25 February – Guillermo Subiabre (d. 1964)
5 November – Guillermo Saavedra (footballer) (d. 1957)

Deaths 
14 July – Manuel Antonio Caro (b. 1835)

References 

 
Years of the 20th century in Chile
Chile